Love Is What We Make It is the eighteenth studio album by Kenny Rogers and his final studio album on Liberty Records, released on March 15, 1985. It is a collection of songs Rogers recorded between 1974 and 1983 that were rejected from his previous studio albums. The album was released by the time he was signed to RCA Nashville.

The title track is a Top 40 hit in the Country and Adult Contemporary charts. "A Stranger in My Place" is a 1974 re-recording of his single with The First Edition.

Track listing

Charts
Album

Singles

References

External links

Kenny Rogers compilation albums
1985 compilation albums
Liberty Records compilation albums